Ashton Chen Xiaolong (born 6 January 1988 in Dengfeng, Zhengzhou, Henan), also known by his stage name Shi Xiaolong  ("Sik Siu-Lung" in Cantonese), is a Chinese actor and martial artist. He is also credited as Xiaolung, Tommy Sik,  Shi Xiao-Lung,  Shi Xiao-Long,  Shi Shao-Long,  Shieh Shiao-Long,  Xi Xiao-Long,  Sik Siu-Loong, and S. L. Sik on some of his films. He has been a disciple of Shi Yongxin, the current abbot of Shaolin Temple, since he was two years old. Originally named "Chen Xiaolong", Chen was given a dharma name—Shi Xiaolong—by the abbot. He was taught martial arts by his father and Shi Yongxin at a young age. He gained attention in the entertainment industry after his performance at the International Shaolin Kung Fu Festival in Zhengzhou at the age of four. He became a child actor in China and achieved great success in films such as the 1994 martial arts comedy Shaolin Popey II: Messy Temple. In 2003, he stopped acting and went to study in the United States. In 2005, he returned to China and starred as Zhan Zhao in the television series Young Justice Bao III. In 2007, he continued his studies in the United States and graduated from high school in 2008 from the prestigious Performing Children's School (PCS) in New York City. He has continued his acting career in China since then. In 2010, Chen played one of Ip Man's students in the martial arts film Ip Man 2.

Filmography 
 Shaolin Popey (1994)
 Shaolin Popey II: Messy Temple (1994)
 Ten Brothers (1995)
 Super Mischieves (1995)
 The Saint of Gamblers (1995)
 China Dragon (1995)
 Dragon in Shaolin (1996)
 Adventurous Treasure Island (1996)
 Chivalrous Legend (1997)
 Heavenly Legend (1999)
 The Marvellous Cook (2000)
 Young Justice Bao (2000)
 Chinese Heroes (2001)
 Teenage Gambler (2002)
 Undiscovered Tomb (2002)
 Black Mask Vs. Gambling Mastermind (2002)
 Kung Fu in Japan (2002)
 Nothing! Nothing! Nothing! (2002)
 Kung Fu Cooker (2002)
 Fatal Comic (2002)
 The Recreant Teenager
 Iron Lion (2003)
 Shaolin Gang (2004)
 Ocean Paradise (2010)
 Legend of the Swordsman (2010)
 Ip Man 2 (2010)
 Rhythm of the Rain (2013)
 Urban Games (2014)
 Gutian Conference (2016)
 The Founding of an Army (2017)
 Martial Universe (2018)

References

External links 
 
 Ashton Chen on Sina Blog
 Ashton Chen on Sina Weibo

1988 births
Living people
Chinese martial artists
Male actors from Henan
Sportspeople from Henan
People from Zhengzhou
Chinese male film actors
Chinese male television actors
Disciples of Shaolin Temple
Shaolin Temple